Xinhua District may refer to:

 Xinhua District, Cangzhou, Hebei
 Xinhua District, Shijiazhuang, Hebei
 Xinhua District, Pingdingshan, Henan
 Xinhua District, Tainan

District name disambiguation pages